Alâeddin Mosque, is the name of a number of mosques, mostly in Turkey. It may refer to:

Alâeddin Mosque, in Konya, Turkey
Alâeddin Eskişehir Mosque, in Eskişehir, Turkey
Alâeddin Niğde Mosque, in Niğde, Turkey
Alâeddin Sinop Mosque, in Sinop, Turkey
Alâeddin Jugra Mosque, in Jugra, Malaysia